William J. Taugher (April 17, 1906 – February 25, 1943) was a Canadian professional ice hockey goaltender who played from 1925 until 1936, including stops with the Montreal Canadiens of the National Hockey League (NHL), and Buffalo Bisons, Cleveland Falcons and Rochester Cardinals of the International Hockey League (IHL).

He played one game in the NHL, with Montreal Canadiens in 1925–1926.  He then played two seasons with Hamilton Tigers of the CPHL and six seasons with Buffalo Bisons of the IHL.  He helped the Bisons win two league titles.  He suffered a serious head injury in 1931 after taking a puck to the face.  He died at the age of 36 from a brain tumour.

References

External links

1906 births
1943 deaths
Montreal Canadiens players
Canadian ice hockey goaltenders
Deaths from brain tumor
Deaths from cancer in Canada
Canadian expatriate ice hockey players in the United States